A New Song is a pamphlet of poems, chants, ballads and songs published by the International Workers Order in 1938.

Music books
Pamphlets
1938 books